The 1970–71 Ranji Trophy was the 37th season of the Ranji Trophy. Bombay won their 13th title in a row defeating Maharashtra in the final.

A proposal to promote two teams from the zonal leagues to the knockout stage was made Maharashtra in the working committee meeting of BCCI at Shillong on 16 August 1970. Bombay had won Ranji Trophy in the previous twelve seasons and Maharashtra repeatedly found their qualification from the West Zone blocked. Ironically, Maharashtra won the West Zone in the 1970–71 and Bombay finished second in the zone for the first time since 1958–59. But the new rules enabled Bombay to qualify for the knockout matches as the second team and they eventually beat Maharashtra in the final.

Highlights
 From this season, two teams qualified from each zone to the knockout rounds.
 For the first time in 13 seasons, Bombay finished second in the West Zone, but thanks to new rule, qualified to the quarterfinals behind Maharashtra. They then won their 13th title in a row beating Maharashtra in the final.

Group stage

South Zone

North Zone

Central Zone

West Zone

East Zone

Knockout stage

Semi-finals

Final

Scorecards and average
Cricketarchive

References

External links
 Ranji Trophy, 1970-71 at ESPN Cricinfo
 Ranji Trophy, 1970-71  at BCCI
 

1971 in Indian cricket
Ranji Trophy seasons
Domestic cricket competitions in 1970–71